FC Smena-Zenit was a Russian football club from Saint Petersburg, founded in 2008. It played one season in 2009 in the Russian Second Division as the farm-club of FC Zenit. After the 2009 season, FC Zenit decided to dissolve the club as not fulfilling the expectations.

External links
Unofficial Fan Site

References

Association football clubs established in 2008
Association football clubs disestablished in 2009
Defunct football clubs in Saint Petersburg
FC Zenit Saint Petersburg
2008 establishments in Russia
2009 disestablishments in Russia